Hostile City Showdown (1995) was the second Hostile City Showdown professional wrestling event produced by Extreme Championship Wrestling (ECW). It took place on April 15, 1995 in the ECW Arena in Philadelphia, Pennsylvania, US. It was a "double header" event with Three Way Dance, which took place the prior weekend. The announcer for the event was Joey Styles.

Event 
In the opening match of the event, Mikey Whipwreck took on Stevie Richards. After interference by Hack Meyers and Raven on behalf of Whipwreck and Richards respectively, Whipwreck delivered a FrankenMikey to Richards then pinned him.

In the second bout, Tsubo Genjin took on Tony Stetson. Genjin performed a leg drop for the win.

In the third bout, Axl Rotten took on Ian Rotten in a Barbed Wire Baseball Bat match. Ian wrapped barbed wire around Axl's head and hit him with a chair to win the match.

The fourth bout was scheduled to be a singles match between Raven and Tommy Dreamer. The event saw the incipient feud between Raven and Dreamer develop, with Raven delivering a promo in which he revealed that his girlfriend, Beulah McGillicutty (who had debuted earlier that month at Three Way Dance), had been spurned by Dreamer at a summer camp as a teenager and had now aligned herself with Raven to seek revenge. The two then began their match. Near the end of the match, Beulah interfered on Raven's behalf and was given a piledriver by Dreamer. Dreamer later described the match as the first time the ECW fans "truly accepted [him]".

The fifth bout saw Eddie Guerrero defend the ECW World Television Championship against Dean Malenko. After a back and forth match between the two, the match ended in a time limit draw. As a result, Guerrero retained the title.

In the sixth bout, Shane Douglas defended the ECW World Heavyweight Championship against The Sandman. Douglas' valet Woman struck Douglas in the knee with a Singapore cane while he was applying a crossface chickenwing to Sandman, enabling The Sandman to pin Douglas and end his year-long title reign. Woman then reunited with Sandman, revealing her alliance with Douglas as a ruse. Following the match, Douglas donned a Monday Night Raw t-shirt and insulted the audience, reflecting his imminent departure from ECW to join rival promotion the World Wrestling Federation.

In the seventh bout, The Public Enemy (Johnny Grunge and Rocco Rock) defended the ECW World Tag Team Championship against The Pitbulls (Pitbull #1 and Pitbull #2). Pitbull #1 avoided a Drive-By by Public Enemy and then Grunge tossed him into the corner and Rocco pinned Pitbull #1 with a schoolboy to retain the title.

In the penultimate match, 911 took on Ron Simmons. Simmons climbed up the top rope but 911 chokeslammed him from the top rope for the win.

The main event was a singles match between Terry Funk and Cactus Jack. As the match progressed, Mikey Whipwreck and Hack Meyers tried to interfere on Jack's behalf but Funk thwarted their interference. Jack managed to hit a DDT to Funk and covered him for the pinfall but The Sandman broke the pinfall by hitting Jack with a Singapore cane. Cactus nailed another DDT to Funk for the win. After the match, Sandman continued to attack Jack with the cane and Funk tried to hit a branding iron on fire to Jack but Jack snatched it away and a brawl ensued.

Reception
Matt Peddycord of Wrestling Recaps wrote "Guerrero-Malenko is the start of something GOOD. Raven-Dreamer is historically important to the angle. There’s a changing of the guard so to speak now that Sandman is the ECW world champ. The rest is the standard procedure from ECW. Mild thumbs up for Hostile City Showdown 1995."

The Wrestling Revolution staff wrote "A complete and total one match show. Aside from being easily the best match on the card, Guerrero vs. Malenko really stands out here because it is the only match on the card aside from the opener that isn’t a wild brawl. By the time we got up to the main event, I was sick of seeing weapons already."

Results

References

External links 
 

Hostile City Showdown
1995 in professional wrestling
Professional wrestling in Pennsylvania
Events in Philadelphia
Professional wrestling in Philadelphia
April 1995 events in the United States